Henry Kemble may refer to:
 Henry Kemble (actor, born 1848) (1848–1907), British actor
 Henry Stephen Kemble (1789–1836), British actor
 Henry Kemble (politician) (1787–1857), British member of parliament